Joseph Johnson (born 20 October 1945) is a Malaysian field hockey player. He competed in the men's tournament at the 1968 Summer Olympics.

References

External links
 

1945 births
Living people
Malaysian male field hockey players
Olympic field hockey players of Malaysia
Field hockey players at the 1968 Summer Olympics
Place of birth missing (living people)